Alois Glück (born 24 January 1940) is a German politician of the CSU in Bavaria.

Life and career
Glück was born in Hörzing in the district of Traunstein. He started his political engagement in the Catholic Rural Youth Movement of Germany
. After a journalistic career the skilled agriculturist was elected for the CSU in the Landtag of Bavaria in 1970. In 1986 Franz Josef Strauß appointed him as a permanent secretary in the Bavarian State Ministry for State Development and Environmental Questions, since 1988 he led the CSU Landtag fraction and from 1994 to 2007 the CSU district association Upper Bavaria. In 2003 he was selected to the Landtagspräsident (President of the Landtag).

Since July 1999 Glück is additionally the chairman of the CSU principle commission. As such he operatively contributed to the development of strategic CSU position documents like "Aktive Bürgergesellschaft" (Active Commoners Society) and "Soziale Marktwirtschaft für das 21. Jahrhundert" (Social Market Economy for the 21st Century).

Apart from his political career Glück has accepted many honorary posts. Since 1983 he is a member of the Zentralkomitee der deutschen Katholiken  (Central Committee of German Catholics – and its president since 2009), the chairman of the Bergwacht Bayern (Mountain rescue Bavaria), of the charity association Caritas Children's Village Irschenberg.

Other activities
 Freundeskreis Abtei Frauenwörth, Chairman of the Circle of Friends
 Hanns Seidel Foundation, Vice Chairman
 ProChrist, Member of the Board of Trustees
 Freya von Moltke Foundation, Member of the Board of Trustees 
 German Council for Sustainable Development (RNE), Member (2011-2016, appointed ad personam by Chancellor Angela Merkel)

References

External links 

 www.alois-glueck.de – Official website of Alois Glück (German)

1940 births
Living people
People from Traunstein (district)
Christian Social Union in Bavaria politicians
Knights Commander of the Order of Merit of the Federal Republic of Germany
Members of the European Academy of Sciences and Arts
Members of the Landtag of Bavaria